Priddis Greens is a hamlet in Alberta, Canada within the Foothills County. The hamlet is developed in two residential nodes adjacent to the Priddis Greens Golf & Country Club.

Demographics 
The population of Priddis Greens according to the 2003 municipal census conducted by Foothills County is 267.

Golf and country club 
The Priddis Greens Golf & Country Club is a private golf club that consists of two 18-hole championship courses (Hawk and Raven). The price for a membership is approximately $25,000 (2017).

In July 2003, Priddis Greens Golf & Country Club was awarded GOLD status in the Best Private Course in Canada category by Score Golf Magazine's Golfers’ Choice Awards.

2016: Score Magazine ranked Priddis Greens (Hawk) 50th out of the “Top 100 Clubs in Canada”

Tournaments 
The Priddis Greens Golf & Country Club has hosted the following major tournament events:

 CP Women's Open - August 2016
CN Canadian Women's Open - 2009
Alberta PGA Players Tour - 2008
Alberta Senior Ladies Championship - 2007
Alberta PGA Head Pro Championship - 2003
Alberta Mid Amateur - 2001
Alberta PGA Championship - 2000
du Maurier Classic - 1999
Canadian Amputee Open - 1997
City Lady Amateur - 1996
George Reed's Club 34 Pro Am - 1988 to 1995
Canadian Club Professionals - 1994
Men's City Amateur - 1993
Junior Team Trials - 1993
City Senior Ladies Amateur - 1991
City Men's Medalist - 1988
Alberta Mid Amateur - 1987

See also 
List of communities in Alberta
List of hamlets in Alberta

References

External links 
Priddis Greens Golf & Country Club

Foothills County
Hamlets in Alberta